Carlos Oviedo Cavada, O. de M. (19 January 1927 – 7 December 1998) was a Chilean Cardinal of the Catholic Church. He served as Archbishop of Santiago de Chile from 1990 to 1998, and was elevated to the cardinalate in 1994.

Biography
Cavada was born in Santiago, and entered the Order of Mercy on 28 January 1944, taking simple vows on 18 March 1945 and solemn vows on 19 March 1948. He entered the Pontifical Catholic University of Chile. He was ordained on 24 September 1949 in Santiago and later went on to study at the Pontifical Gregorian University in Rome from 1949 to 1953 where he earned a doctorate in canon law.

He was a faculty member and spiritual director at St. Peter Nolasco School and after that a faculty member at the Pontifical Catholic University of Chile from 1953 until 1958. From 1958 until 1961 he worked in the general curia of his order and pursued further studies in the Vatican Secret Archives.

Pope Paul VI appointed him titular bishop of Benevento and Auxiliary Bishop of Concepción on 21 March 1964. He attended the Second Vatican Council from 1964 until the close of the council in 1965. He was promoted to the metropolitan see of Antofagasta in 1974. He was transferred to the metropolitan see of Santiago de Chile on 30 March 1990.

He was created Cardinal Priest of S. Maria della Scala in the consistory of 26 November 1994 by Pope John Paul II. He resigned as Archbishop of Santiago de Chile on 16 February 1998, but continued governing the archdiocese as Apostolic Administrator until a successor took possession in April of that year. He died in December.

References

1927 births
1998 deaths
People from Santiago
Chilean cardinals
Participants in the Second Vatican Council
20th-century Roman Catholic archbishops in Chile
Roman Catholic archbishops of Santiago de Chile
Pontifical Gregorian University alumni
Cardinals created by Pope John Paul II
Roman Catholic archbishops of Antofagasta
Roman Catholic bishops of San Juan de Calama